Gloria Colón (26 March 1931 – 17 September 2010) was a Puerto Rican fencer. She competed in the women's individual foil event at the 1960 Summer Olympics. She was the first woman to represent Puerto Rico at the Olympics.

References

1931 births
2010 deaths
People from Río Piedras, Puerto Rico
Puerto Rican female fencers
Olympic fencers of Puerto Rico
Fencers at the 1960 Summer Olympics